The Raymond Brake was an indie rock band. They formed in the mid-1990s in Greensboro, North Carolina. The band was influenced by the thriving music scene of nearby Chapel Hill.

History 

The band's first releases were two 7-inch records, both released in 1994. A debut LP, Piles of Dirty Winters was released on Arlington Virginia indie label Simple Machines in 1995, followed by a split 7-inch. Reviews of The Raymond Brake's releases often noted that the band's sound blended strange tunings and timings with hooks and melody, observations which in turn led to comparisons bands such as Polvo and Grifters. The band embarking on a tour of the U.S. in 1996 with Karate, Archers of Loaf, and Liquorice. However, the same year saw The Raymond Brake's final release: the Never Work Ever CD EP on Hepcat Records. In 1998 the band had played their last show. Singer and guitarist Andy Cabic  moved to San Francisco, and began performing with Devendra Banhart and Joanna Newsom. He is currently the driving force behind Vetiver.

Drummer Joel Darden continues to play for the Greensboro-based band, The Kneads.

Members 

Andy Cabic – guitar, vocals (1994-1998)
Ryan Stewart – guitar, vocals (1994-1998)
Peder Hollinghurst – bass (1994–1996)
Matt Houston – bass (1997–1998)
Joel Darden – drums (1994-1998)

References

External links
The Raymond Brake Biography from Simply Machines Records

Indie rock musical groups from North Carolina
Mammoth Records artists